= Eslanagan, California =

Eslanagan is a former Costanoan settlement in Monterey County, California, United States. Its precise location is unknown.
